Lucas Pierre Santos Oliveira (born 19 January 1982 in Itororó), known as Pierre, is a Brazilian footballer who plays for Fluminense as a defensive midfielder.

Honours
Vitória
Bahia State League: 2000

Ituano
São Paulo State League: 2002

Palmeiras
São Paulo State League: 2008

Atlético Mineiro
Minas Gerais State League: 2012, 2013
Copa Libertadores: 2013
Recopa Sudamericana: 2014
Copa do Brasil: 2014

Fluminense
 Primeira Liga: 2016

References

External links

1982 births
Living people
Sportspeople from Bahia
Brazilian footballers
Association football midfielders
Campeonato Brasileiro Série A players
Esporte Clube Vitória players
Ituano FC players
Paraná Clube players
Sociedade Esportiva Palmeiras players
Clube Atlético Mineiro players
Fluminense FC players